Enrique Ramírez is a Chilean artist born in 1979 in Santiago de Chile.

Photographer, filmmaker, sculptor and musician, his work is well known for his films and installations around the sea, a perpetually moving memory space, a space of narrative projections where the destiny of Chile is linked to travels, conquests and migratory flows.

Biography 
Enrique Ramírez studied music and cinema in Chile before going at the Studio National des Arts Contemporains-Le Fresnoy (Tourcoing, France) in 2007.

His father is a sailboat manufacturer in Chile. He appears in several of his films and some of his sculptures are made with sails of boats made by his father.

Enrique Ramírez is interested in poetry and electronic music.

Works 
Enrique Ramírez' work is focus on the sea, both as a historical and fictional setting.

Exhibitions and awards 
In 2013, he won the prix découverte des Amis du Palais de Tokyo, Paris, France

In 2014, he won the Loop fair prize, Barcelona, Spain. In 2019 he is shortlisted in the Marcel Duchamp Prize in France

He has exhibited at the Palais de Tokyo in Paris (France), the Centre Pompidou in Paris (France), the Museo Amparo in Puebla (Mexico), the Museum of Memory in Santiago (Chile).In 2017, he was invited by Christine Macel to be part of  the exhibition "Viva Arte Viva"  at the 57th International Exhibition of the Biennale di Venezia.

His work is part of several private and public collections around the world such as MoMA - Museum of Modern Art, New York  (USA), MACBA - Museu d'Art Contemporani de Barcelona (Spain), PAMM - Pérez Art Museum Miami (USA), Kadist art foundation (France/USA) or MACVAL - Musée d'Art contemporain du Val-de-Marne, Vitry-sur-Seine (France).

References

External links 
 Official website
 Enrique Ramírez open table at 57th Biennale di Venezia
 Enrique Ramírez interview by Enar de Dios Rodríguez for Kadist art foundation San Francisco
 article by Lillian Davies on Artforum international
 article by Alejandra Villasmil on artishock revista

1979 births
Living people
Artists from Santiago